Cordova, officially the Municipality of Cordova,  is a 3rd class municipality in the province of Cebu, Philippines. According to the 2020 census, it has a population of 70,595 people.

Also spelled Cordoba, most of the municipality lies on separate islands off the southern coast of Mactan Island. It is connected by two bridges to the main island of Mactan, which itself is connected to mainland Cebu by the two bridges between Mandaue and Lapu-Lapu City. The Cebu–Cordova Link Expressway, opened in 2022, connects it directly to mainland Cebu in Cebu City.

Cordova is bordered to the north by Lapu-Lapu City, to the west by the Mactan Channel, to the east by the Hilutangan Channel and Olango Island, and to the south by the Cebu Strait.

Cordova lies within Metro Cebu.

Cordova will be developed as a resort area, and urban development will be done using Cebu City as a sample as a resort area.

History 

On 22 May 1863, the Spanish Governor General of the Philippines Rafael Echagüe y Bermingham (San Sebastián, 1815 - Madrid, 1887) created a new town comprising the barrios of Gabi, Dayas and Pilipul (now called Pilipog), all of which are located on the southeastern tip of Mactan Island. Some authors think he chose the name Cordoba which means "stark nakedness and bare", but they do not indicate in what language. The decree of becoming a municipality only became effective in 1864.

However, before being appointed Governor General, in 1858, Rafael Echagüe y Bermingham was representative in the Spanish Congress of Deputies for the province of Cordoba (Spain), so he should have given that name in memory of his previous experiences.

In addition to Spain and the Philippines, there are other cities or provinces named Cordoba, Cordova or Las Cordobas in Argentina, Colombia, USA and Mexico, all of them founded and named by Spanish, in memory of the Spanish Cordoba or the surname/family name of its founders.

Cordova became a municipality in 1864, and from 1913 up to the present, a total of 15 mayors governed the district.

The Cebu–Cordova Link Expressway, which was completed in 2022, connects the town to Cebu City in mainland Cebu. This is the third bridge connecting mainland Cebu to Mactan Island, after the Mactan–Mandaue Bridge and the Marcelo Fernan Bridge, both of which connect the cities of Mandaue in the mainland and Lapu-Lapu City in Mactan.

Geography 

Geographically, Cordova consists of a main island, bordering on and separated from Mactan Island by a narrow stream, as well as the islets of Gilutongan (also spelled Hilutungan), Nalusuan, Shell, Tongo and Lava. The two islets of Gilutongan and Nalusuan are part of the Olango Island Group in the middle of the Cebu Strait.

The surface of the town consists entirely of karstic limestone rock geologically associated with the Plio-Pleistocene Carcar Formation, dated to 2½–3 million years ago.

Climate 

The climate of Cordova is of Coronas type III, meaning the seasons are not very pronounced and are classified as hot and humid.

Barangays

Cordova comprises 13 barangays:

Demographics

Economy

Tourism 

Cordova is a quiet fisherman town off the coast of mainland Cebu. It has several hotels, resorts and accommodations, which include:

 Solea Mactan Resort
 Gilutongan Marine Sanctuary
 Nalusuan Marine Sanctuary
 Dayas Boardwalk and Marine Park
 Kamampay Public Beach
 Bantayan Bay Floating Cottages
 Shey Residence in Buagsong, Cordova
 Entoy's Bakasihan

A special attraction is the mangrove forest and swamp area. The best access to this area is the Day-as Boardwalk and Marine Park. The total mangrove plantation is estimated to cover more or less . Most of the mangrove forest is located in the barangays of Pilipog, Bangbang, San Miguel, Dayas and Catarman.

Education 

The children in Cordova are served by 14 day-care centers, eleven public elementary schools, two private elementary schools, one public high school, a private high school and the public college. Educational achievement is relatively high, with 75% of adults (i.e. 21 years old and above) having finished elementary and high school and 23% have attended university or received a degree. Around 2% of the population report not having received formal schooling.

References

Sources

External links

 
 [ Philippine Standard Geographic Code]

Municipalities of Cebu
Municipalities in Metro Cebu